Lovelady and Love Lady may refer to:

People
 Lovelady Powell (1930 – 2020), American actress and singer
 Edward Lovelady (1898 – after 1925), English professional footballer
 Greg Lovelady (born 1979), American college baseball coach
 John Lovelady, American puppeteer
 Josh Lovelady (born 1978), former American football guard
 Richard Lovelady (born 1995), American baseball player
 Steve Lovelady (1943 – 2010), American journalist
 Victor Lynn Lovelady, American killed in Algeria in the In Aménas hostage crisis
 Victoria Lovelady, (born 1986), Brazilian professional golfer
 William Lovelady, English guitarist

Places in the United States
 Love Lady, Tennessee
 Lovelady, Texas
 Lovelady Independent School District, Lovelady, Texas
 Loveladies, New Jersey

Other uses
"Love Lady" (Damage song), 1997